The 2009 Monaco Grand Prix (officially the Formula 1 Grand Prix de Monaco 2009) was a Formula One motor race that was held on 24 May 2009 at the Circuit de Monaco, in Monaco. The race, which was contested over 78 laps, was the sixth round of the 2009 Formula One season. It was won by Brawn GP driver Jenson Button, with his teammate Rubens Barrichello second, and Ferrari's Kimi Räikkönen third.

This year a peace and sport initiative was introduced on this Grand Prix under the High Patronage of Albert II, Prince of Monaco. Sébastien Bourdais scored his last world championship points at this race.

Report

Background
The first five races of the championship ended with Brawn driver Jenson Button leading the Drivers Championship by 14 points from teammate Rubens Barrichello, having claimed 41 points out of a possible 45. Their Brawn GP team was leading the Constructors Championship with 68 points; second-placed Red Bull had 38.5, with their driver Sebastian Vettel third place in the drivers championship. Reigning World Champion Lewis Hamilton of McLaren was only in seventh place, having accumulated nine points.

Red Bull had a new two-tier diffuser ready for their RB5 car in Monaco, with chief designer Adrian Newey believing it could be a real benefit to the team. The Austrian drinks company team had won the 2009 Chinese Grand Prix . They had finished third and fourth in the previous race at Barcelona. Force India had prepared several important upgrades for the VJM-02, focused upon giving high downforce by modifying the front and rear wings. This was to improve performance to score their first points, having not scored points before in a Formula One race. Most other teams, including Toyota and BMW Sauber, had modified cars to give good downforce and high mechanical grip; important for the Monaco circuit's low speed and twisting, slow corners.

In the run up to the race, Ferrari issued a statement declaring that "Ferrari does not intend to enter its cars in the next Formula One World Championship." if "the introduction of two different sets of regulations based on arbitrary technical rules and economic parameters." were to take place. This was in reference to proposed regulations by the FIA World Motor Sport Council to introduce a Budget Cap for 2010, and allow technical freedom to those teams operating under it. The Renault Formula One team made a similar statement, announcing "If the decisions announced by the World Council on the 29th of April 2009 are not revised, we have no choice but to withdraw from the FIA Formula One World Championship at the end of 2009." These statements were the start of the FIA–FOTA dispute over the 2010 regulations. During the event, scenes for the 2010 film Iron Man 2 were shot, which features a historic Monaco Grand Prix race. Prior to the race the drivers complained about a billboard for Martini featuring model Jessiqa Pace was distracting and in the line of sight of drivers as they exit Loews hairpin.

Practice and qualifying

The early practice sessions at Monaco are traditionally run on the Thursday of the week so that the roads can be opened on the Friday for public access. As such, two practice sessions were held on the Thursday, with the third on Saturday morning, followed shortly by qualifying.

The Thursday practice sessions began with Brawn GP establishing its dominance once again; Rubens Barrichello was fastest by three-tenths of a second from countryman Felipe Massa with a time of 1:17.199, and the two McLarens of Lewis Hamilton and Heikki Kovalainen following shortly thereafter. The Brawns continued their form in the second session, placing third and fourth behind Nico Rosberg – who topped practice for the ninth time this season with a 1:15.243 – and Hamilton once again. A similar story held true for the Saturday session, with Jenson Button narrowly being beaten by Fernando Alonso in the Renault.

The first qualifying session was marked by 2008 winner Lewis Hamilton crashing at Mirabeau and damaging his suspension, putting him out of qualifying and gradually knocking him down the order until he would finish sixteenth, ahead of the BMW Saubers of Nick Heidfeld and Robert Kubica and the Toyotas of Jarno Trulli and Timo Glock. The second session saw the departure of the two Force Indias, both Toro Rossos and Nelson Piquet Jr.'s Renault while Finland's Kimi Räikkönen and Heikki Kovalainen topped the timing sheets. Giancarlo Fisichella had two times disallowed for cutting the corners at the Swimming Pool Complex and Nouvelle Chicane. The third and final session was dominated by Rubens Barrichello and Sebastian Vettel until a late lap from Jenson Button saw the championship leader take his fourth pole from six starts this season with Kimi Räikkönen the highest-placed KERS-equipped car in second place.

Race

At the start, Button maintained his lead as Barrichello passed Räikkönen on the approach to the first corner. Both Brawn cars and Sebastian Vettel started the race on the super-soft tyres; the Ferraris and Williams started on the soft compound. This provided an advantage, as the super-soft tyres – which had proven to be the better of the two all weekend – started to lose grip drastically after twelve laps as championship contender Sebastian Vettel proved when he started losing up to four seconds per lap on leader Button, because of the difficulty in overtaking at Monaco, this greatly helped the Brawn GP drivers and Kimi Räikkönen (the only three drivers ahead of Vettel when his tyres started to lose grip), because for several minutes all cars behind him found themselves unable to overtake, opening a huge gap between third and fourth, even for several laps after Vettel had been overtaken.

Sébastien Buemi had an accident running into Nelson Piquet Jr. on lap 10 during a passing attempt at Sainte Devote, while Vettel slid into the barriers under brakes at the same spot several laps later. Button maintained a fifteen-second lead over teammate Barrichello for most of the race, who had a smaller gap over the Ferraris of Kimi Räikkönen and Felipe Massa; Massa raised the ire of the stewards after crossing the chicane at the Swimming Pool Complex twice, though no penalty was awarded as both occasions were due to driver error.

In the late stages of the race, Heikki Kovalainen crashed out at the Swimming Pool, spinning and colliding with the barriers. Kazuki Nakajima also crashed out on the last lap of the race at Mirabeau. Robert Kubica was the only other retirement, his race ending with brake problems. In the final phase of the race, the Ferraris pitted for the super-soft tyres, discovering the same graining problem as everyone else over longer stints. The distance between Button and Barrichello halved over the final few laps, though Button was deliberately slowing to avoid encountering backmarkers who were fighting for position. He won by seven-and-a-half seconds from Barrichello, with the Ferraris of Räikkönen and Massa third and fourth.

After the end of the race, Button mistakenly parked his car in parc fermé in the pit lane as is normal for other Grands Prix, rather than on the main straight with the other two podium finishers as is the norm for Monaco. As a result, he had to run down the start/finish straight to the podium.

With his win, Button scored the  third-best  start to a season in Formula One history, with five victories and one  third place. Also, his victory in the Brawn-Mercedes  marked the first time in modern F1 history that a single engine has won  three races in a row – engines in the  1950s lasted most of a season, sometimes more than one season. It was also the first time since  that a driver had won three races in succession. Michael Schumacher was the last to do so, as he won the United States, French  and German Grands Prix.

Classification
Cars that used KERS are marked with "‡"

Qualifying

 Lewis Hamilton was given a five place grid penalty for an unscheduled gearbox change following the qualifying session, as per the sporting regulations.
 Timo Glock had to start from the pit lane following modifications in the car between the qualifying and the race.

Race

Championship standings after the race 

Drivers' Championship standings

Constructors' Championship standings

 Note: Only the top five positions are included for both sets of standings.

See also 
 2009 Monaco GP2 Series round

References

External links 

Monaco Grand Prix
Monaco Grand Prix
Grand Prix
Monaco Grand Prix